This is an incomplete list of rugby league players who have represented their country or representative team while playing for the Auckland Warriors or New Zealand Warriors and the years they  achieved their honours, if known.

International

New Zealand

Australia

Cook Islands

England

Fiji

Great Britain

Italy

Tonga

(Western) Samoa

Scotland

United States

Wales

Other honours

All Golds

Australian Prime Minister's XIII

Indigenous All Stars

New South Wales

New South Wales City

New Zealand Māori

World/NRL All Stars

Queensland

Representative Captains

New Zealand

All Golds

Coaching staff

International

New Zealand

Samoa

References
 NZLeague.co.nz
 Rugby League in New Zealand
 Matthew's Unofficial Warriors Page
 Official Warriors Site
 2000 World Cup
 International Squads 1997

New Zealand Warriors
Rugby league representative players lists
Warriors representatives
New Zealand rugby league lists